United Thai People's Party is a political party in Thailand founded on 24 October 1968 was founded by Thanom Kittikachorn and Praphas Charusathien to recruit parliamentary support for their military junta.

In the 1969 Thai general election United Thai People's Party won the most seats in election: 75 of 219 seats. The party was dissolved during the self-coup of Thanom Kittikachorn and Praphas Charusathien in November 1971 that brought a return to unrestricted military dictatorship.

After the October 1973 popular uprising that toppled the Thanom–Praphas regime, some of the more liberal former members of the United Thai People's Party joined the Social Action Party, while former secretary-general Dawee Chullasapya and his deputy Kris Sivara backed the Social Justice Party.

Executive Committee of the United Thai People's Party (1968-1971) 
 Thanom Kittikachorn (Leader)
 Praphas Charusathien (Vice-Leader)
 Pote Sarasin (Vice-Leader)
 Dawee Chullasapya (Secretary-General)
 Kris Sivara (Vice Secretary-General)
 Sawang Senanarong (Vice Secretary-General)
 Pichai Kullavanich (Vice Secretary-General)
 Serm Vinitchaikul (Committee)
 Pong Punnakan (Committee)
 Jitti Navisatean (Committee)
 Tawee Rangkhum (Committee)
 Chuchat Kamphu (Committee)
 Kris Punnagun (Committee)
 Jaroon Chatiaroon (Committee)
 Boonchu Chantarubekkha (Committee)
 Sanga Kittikachorn (Committee)

References

External links 
 ยุคสมัยแห่งจอมพลถนอม จอมพลประภาส พันเอกณรงค์

Defunct political parties in Thailand
1968 establishments in Thailand
Political parties established in 1968
Political parties disestablished in 1971